Delroy James (born June 4, 1987) is a Guyanese-born, naturalized American professional basketball player who plays for Real Estelí Baloncesto of the BCL Americas. At a height of 2.03 m (6'8") tall, and a weight of 105 kg (232 lbs.), he can play at the power forward and small forward positions, with power forward being his main position.

High school career
James only started playing basketball whilst in his sophomore high school year, he left Brooklyn that same year, moving to National Christian Academy (Fort Washington, Maryland). For his junior year he moved to Florida Prep (Lake Suzy, Florida) before again transferring the same year, to Laurinburg Institute. He stayed at Laurinburg for his senior season as they accrued a 24-1 record in 2004–05.

During high school he also played in the AAU for New York City sides Aneesa Sports, and the Student-Athlete Broncos,

College career
James was ranked a three star player by both Rivals.com and Scout.com, respectively seen as the 30th and 35th best in his position nationally for 2005.
He committed to Rhode Island, playing in the Atlantic 10 Conference of the NCAA Division I, in August 2005, signing a letter of intent in November, over other scholarship offers.

However, after NCAA Initial-Eligibility issues, he had to sit out the entire 2006–07 season.
Later he "violated a team academic rule" according to coach Jim Baron, leading to him also missing the first semester of the 2007–08 season.
Making his belated debut in the first game of the second semester in December 2007, he had little impact in his freshman season, playing less than 10 minutes on average (3.3 points, 2.4 rebounds) though he had some more notable games.

He came to the fore during his first full season the next year as a sophomore. Playing nearly 25 minutes per game, he averaged 9.9 points and 6.1 rebounds (12th in the Atlantic 10), being awarded as A-10 Sixth Man of the Year.
 
During his junior season, he started all games, was second best for Rhode Island in scoring (13.2 ppg), rebounding (5.3 rpg) and steals (1.4 spg) and best in blocks (1.2 bpg), on his way to a selection in the All-Atlantic 10 Third Team and NABC All-District 4 Second Team.
His performances in the 2010 National Invitation Tournament led to a selection to the All-Tournament Team as the Rams made the semi-finals. 
These included a career high 34 points against Nevada, a game in which he was credited for restricting Luke Babbitt, the eighth-leading scorer in the nation at the time with 22.1 points per game, to two field goals made (out of fourteen attempted) for 14 points.

In 2010–11, the senior led the Rams in scoring (17.6, 5th in A-10), rebounding (7.8, 6th), steals (1.6, 6th) and blocks, he was only player in the country averaging at least 17.5 points, 7.5 rebounds, 2.5 assists, 1.5 steals and 1.0 blocks per game, leading to a selection to the All-Atlantic 10 Second Team, also making the 2011 NABC All-District 4 Second Team and USBWA All-District 1 Team.
He scored the first triple-double in Rhode Island history against Miami (Ohio) in the 2011 College Basketball Invitational during his penultimate college game, finishing his Rams career after a loss in the quarterfinals.

As of 2014, he was 16th on the URI career scoring list (1,460 points), 8th in career blocks (104), steals (146) and games played (123) and 6th in minutes (1,160).

Professional career

2011–12 season
James attended the Portsmouth Invitational Tournament, organised in April 2011 by the NBA prior to the draft. He also enthusiastically attended workouts with different NBA teams to overcome the predictions that saw him undrafted in the 2011 NBA draft.
He would go undrafted in the end. Furthermore, the 2011 NBA lockout canceled summer leagues and free agent camps, meaning he would have to move abroad to start his professional career.

He joined Israeli team Bnei Hasharon – a team his elder brother Shawn had just left after 3 successful years – signing his first professional contract, a reported six figure deal.
He adapted quickly, starting all but one game including three from start to finish, to finish with 16.1 points and 7.7 rebounds on average in 10 games, including a double-double against Shawn's new team, league leaders Maccabi Tel Aviv.
He also earned an Israeli League player of the week award during his time in the league.

However, he was released in January 2012, returning to the U.S. to finish the season with NBA D-League team Tulsa 66ers, posting 8.8 points and 4.8 rebounds per game.

2012–13 season
After one game in May 2012 for IBA side Jersey G-Force, he attended NBA free agent camps, before playing in the Las Vegas Summer League for the Atlanta Hawks. There he played totals of 21 minutes in 4 games, for 9 points with 2 rebounds.

With the Summer League over, James returned to Europe, this time to Italy with second tier LegaDue side Basket Ferentino . He signed a one-year deal in August 2012 after General Manager Pierfrancesco Betti – who had seen him play in Portsmouth the year before – persuaded him through an exposé of the club's achievements in propelling foreign players, such as Manu Ginóbili, to stronger sides. He impressed at Ferentino and dominated in the league, leading to a call up to the Legadue All-Star Game, on which occasion he was nominated game MVP.

2013–14 season
After an unfruitful 2013 NBA Summer League with the Utah Jazz, with James not playing a single minute, he joined Enel Brindisi in August 2013, signing a one-year deal with the first division Serie A side.
James had no problem adapting to the higher level of competition and when he was called up to the Serie All-Star Game he was described as "one of the keys to Brindisi's success".
In nearly 30 minutes per game, he contributed 12.2 points, 7.8 rebounds and 1.3 blocks per game, (the last two respectively 5th and 4th best in the league) as Brindisi finished in fifth place at the end of the regular season.
However they were swept in the playoffs, with James missing three free-throws in the dying seconds of the first game 73-75 defeat to Banco di Sardegna Sassari. 
His stats dipped in the playoffs, with 8 points, 7.3 rebounds and 0.3 blocks in more than 31 minutes, with his free throw shooting a measly 55.6%.

2014–15 season
Despite offers from around Europe, James stayed in Apulia for 2014–15, the only foreigner to do so,  in order to "finish his work" after the previous season's playoff defeat.
He would make his European debut, along with the club, in the Europe-wide third tier EuroChallenge, ending with 10.7 points, 6 rebounds, 0.5 blocks against 3.2 fouls (the latter 3 in the tournament top 20) as Brindisi reached the quarterfinals.
In Serie A, Brindisi would finish 6th of the regular season, with James again the 4th best shot blocker after contributing 1.1 blocks per game in around 29 minutes, adding 10.2 points, 7.5 rebounds and 2.1 assists against 3.1 fouls and 2.7 turnovers.
Brindisi obtained a historic first playoff win during the series against Grissin Bon Reggio Emilia, James' duel with Achille Polonara was cited as a determinant factor in the following game 3 win, however they would go on to lose the series 3-2.

2015–16 season
During the 2015 offseason, James participated in the Ball Up Million Dollar Summer Challenge streetball tournament, winning the tournament with New York-based Sean Bell All-Stars and also collecting the MVP prize (along with the prize money).
In August 2015, he signed with Russian side Yenisey Krasnoyarsk of the VTB United League.

2016–17 season
On August 10, 2016, James signed with Italian club Pallacanestro Reggiana. On January 11, 2017, he left Reggiana and signed with Turkish club Best Balıkesir.

2017–18 season
On August 9, 2017, James signed a one-year contract with Greek club AEK Athens. With AEK, he won the Greek Cup title, in 2018.

2018–19 season
On August 10, 2018, James signed with Gaziantep of the Turkish Basketball Super League.

On January 2, 2019, James returned to AEK Athens signed contract until the summer of 2020.

2019–20 season
On August 3, 2019, he has signed with Seoul Samsung Thunders of the Korean Basketball League.

On February 9, 2020, he has signed with UCAM Murcia of the Liga ACB.

2020–21 season
On September 9, 2020, James signed with Promitheas Patras of the Greek Basket League.

In January 2021, he signed with Real Estelí Baloncesto in Nicaragua.

2022–2023 season
In 2022, James signed with Team Cali of the Baloncesto Profesional Colombiano.

The Basketball Tournament (TBT)
In the summer of 2017, James, for the second year, competed in The Basketball Tournament on ESPN for Team Fancy.  In three games, he averaged 14.0 points, 4.7 rebounds and 1.7 assists to help lead his team to the Super 16 Round where they lost 65-61 to Boeheim's Army; a team composed of Syracuse University basketball alum.  James also competed in TBT in 2015 for the Sean Bell All-Star's.  In four games that summer, he averaged 9.3 points, 5.3 rebounds and 3.0 assists per game. In TBT 2018, James averaged 10.5 points, 6.5 rebounds, and 1.5 steals per game for Team Fancy. They reached the second round before falling to Boeheim's Army. name

Player profile
James is a versatile left-handed combo forward. 
A hustle player, he does the little things that help his team with a physical and high-energy style.

In attack, he starts from the perimeter, working off the dribble or moving without the ball to set up a scoring opportunity. He is deceptively fast and can burst past defenders, using shot fakes and step throughs on the way, though he can lose control of his run and the ball or try low percentage shots.
His size and strength allow him to muscle his way to the hoop, shielding the ball with ease, he can finish even through contact.
With a good mid-range jump shot, he's hard to guard due to his size, adding his play in the paint it makes him an all-around scoring threat when in form.

He shines more in defense, where his hustle play and non-stop effort allow him to make an impact, most notably in rebounding on a statistical front.
His physical attributes allow him to guard anyone, from point guard to power forward, though he has been noted to struggle against perimeter players. Never afraid to mix it up he uses his athleticism to keep his man off-balance.

Observers feel that for him to play in the NBA, as a 3, he needs to consistently and confidently make shots from the three point line, getting his shot off quicker and smoother.
Finishing college at 24, he was not foreseen at the time to change his playing style radically or develop exponentially, though his work ethic was expected to ensure a long, sustained career.

Personal life
The son of Gordon and Marva James, Delroy has seven siblings, including three sisters and four brothers.
Three of his older brothers played basketball at a professional or collegiate level:
-Shawn James played with Serie A club EA7 Emporio Armani Milano.
-Gordon has played professionally in Japan and Latin America.
-Lex played for St. Francis without going professional.

His parents moved to the United States from Guyana in 1990 along with four children. They left Delroy with two siblings whilst they made arrangements for them to join them, something that proved possible about 3 years later. Arriving in Brooklyn, New York aged 7, he struggled to adapt to a completely different environment. Though he skipped classes, he also avoided getting involved in the gangs that were rife in his neighbourghood.
He has a son, Jaylen, he cites fatherhood as one of his greatest accomplishments, another is graduating and a declared future goal of his would be to use his sociology degree to become a guidance counselor or mentor to children.

Career statistics

|-
| align=center | 2015-16
| align=left | Enisey Krasnoyarsk
| align=center | VTB United
| 30 || 27.6 || .436 || .341 || .791 || 6.5 || 2.8 || 1.1 || .9 || 12.5
|-
| align=center | 2016-17
| align=left | Best Balikesir
| align=center | TBL
| 16 || 32.1 || .497 || .426 || .776 || 5.7 || 2.4 || 1.3 || .9 || 15.8
|-
| align=center | 2016-17
| align=left | Grissin Bon Reggio Emilia
| align=center | LBA
| 15 || 18.1 || .337 || .188 || .571 || 3.5 || 1.5 || .9 || .9 || 5.1
|-
| align=center | 2017–18
| align=left | A.E.K.
| align=center | GBL
| 25 || 20.5 || .404 || .227 || .691 || 3.5 || 1.7 || 1.0 || .4 || 7.1
|-
| align=center | 2017-18
| align=left | A.E.K.
| align=center | BCL
| 20 || 22.0 || .453 || .312 || .700 || 4.4 || 1.6 || 1.1 || .8 || 8.7
|-
| align=center | 2018-19
| align=left | A.E.K.
| align=center | GBL
| 27 || 20.0 || .456 || .184 || .853 || 3.3 || 1.5 || .6 || .6 || 7.0
|-
| align=center | 2018-19
| align=left | A.E.K.
| align=center | BCL
| 9 || 17.3 || .455 || .300 || .800 || 3.6 || 1.8 || 1.0 || 1.1 || 5.7
|-
| align=center | 2018-19
| align=left | Royal Hali Gaziantep
| align=center | T-BSL
| 11 || 24.8 || .364 || .333 || .708 || 4.4 || 1.1 || .6 || .5 || 9.1
|-
| align=center | 2018-19
| align=left | Meralco Bolts
| align=center | PBA
| 3 || 41.2 || .485 || .409 || .650 || 8.7 || 6.7 || 1.7 || 2.0 || 28.7
|-
|-class=sortbottom
| align="center" colspan=2 | Career
| All Leagues
| 169 || 22.0 || .437 || .310 || .736 || 4.3 || 1.8 || .9 || .7 || 8.9

Honours
Greek Basketball Super Cup: (2020)

References

External links
RealGM.com Profile
Eurobasket.com Profile
Greek Basket League Profile
Italian League Profile 
TBLStat.net Profile

1987 births
Living people
AEK B.C. players
American expatriate basketball people in Greece
American expatriate basketball people in Israel
American expatriate basketball people in Italy
American expatriate basketball people in the Philippines
American expatriate basketball people in South Korea
American men's basketball players
American sportspeople of Guyanese descent
Basket Ferentino players
Basketball players from New York City
Best Balıkesir B.K. players
BC Enisey players
Bnei HaSharon players
CB Murcia players
Gaziantep Basketbol players
Guyanese men's basketball players
Israeli Basketball Premier League players
Lega Basket Serie A players
Liga ACB players
Meralco Bolts players
New Basket Brindisi players
Pallacanestro Reggiana players
Philippine Basketball Association imports
Power forwards (basketball)
Real Estelí Baloncesto players
Rhode Island Rams men's basketball players
Seoul Samsung Thunders players
Sportspeople from Brooklyn
Tulsa 66ers players